Rodolfo dos Reis Ferreira (born 29 January 1954 in Porto) is a Portuguese former football defensive midfielder and manager.

See also
List of one-club men

External links

1954 births
Living people
Portuguese footballers
Footballers from Porto
Association football midfielders
Primeira Liga players
FC Porto players
Portugal youth international footballers
Portugal under-21 international footballers
Portugal international footballers
Portuguese football managers
Primeira Liga managers
Liga Portugal 2 managers
F.C. Famalicão managers
Gil Vicente F.C. managers
S.C. Beira-Mar managers
C.D. Nacional managers